Australia Day is a 2017 Australian drama anthology film directed by Kriv Stenders and starring Bryan Brown.

Premise
On Australia Day, three Australians from different cultural backgrounds will cross paths, creating racial tension issues and national identity that simmer underneath the surface of modern-day Australia.

Cast
Bryan Brown as Terry Friedman
Shari Sebbens as Sonya Mackenzie
Sean Keenan as Dean Patterson
Isabelle Cornish as Chloe Patterson
Daniel Webber as Jason Patterson
Elias Anton as Sami Ghaznavi
Kee Chan as Zhou Chong
Sam Cotton as Constable Buchanan
Caroline Dunphy as Patricia Kendall
Simon Elrahi as Karim
Yasmin Honeychurch as Kaytee Tucker

Reception
Australia Day received mixed reviews from critics and audiences, earning a 57% approval rating on Rotten Tomatoes.

David Stratton of The Australian gave a positive review, calling the film "Run Lola Run meets Gran Torino; breathtakingly fast-moving, a very well-made thriller." Erin Free of FILMINK also gave a positive review, calling the film "a big, broiling stew of complex thought, Australia Day is a provocative, intelligent film that dares to pick, probe and ask a lot of burning questions."

Alex Lines of Film Inquiry gave a negative review, saying the film "is a series of predictable story arcs, rudimentary characters and simplistic viewpoints on racism." Vicky Roach of The Daily Telegraph wrote that the story "is carried along by the momentum of its characters. But when they run out of steam, so does the screenplay."

Accolades

References

External links
Australia Day on Internet Movie Database
Australia Day on Rotten Tomatoes

2017 films
Australian drama films
Films directed by Kriv Stenders
Films set in Brisbane
Films shot in Brisbane
2010s English-language films
Screen Australia films